Piano: The Melody of a Young Girl's Heart (ピアノ Piano, stylized as PIANO) is an anime television series which aired from November 11, 2002 to January 13, 2003, and ran for 10 episodes. Three volumes were released on DVD by Right Stuf under their Nozomi Entertainment label in the North America as well as a complete collection in one collectors edition package, with their English dub being produced by NYAV Post. Centering on Miu Nomura (野村 美雨 Nomura Miu), the story follows her as she struggles to rediscover the joy in music and playing piano she once knew as a child. Character designs were done by Kōsuke Fujishima who came up with the concept and idea for the show.

Plot summary
Miu Nomura always played the piano and found it to be one of the greatest joys in her life. Even when she was a little girl the music she played on her piano made her heart soar, a feeling she desired to share with anyone who would listen, as she eagerly shared her talent on with the piano to those around her. As time passed, she became an introverted teenager far too shy to express her feelings and even unable to do it through her music anymore. It has gotten so bad that her playing has suffered greatly and her piano teacher has grown impatient with Miu's continual failure to live up to the expectations he knows she is capable of reaching if she could just try a little harder.

Miu's crush on an upperclassman named Takahashi doesn't help and only adds to her emotional state. Even her best friend, Yuuki, who notices Miu's crush cannot help because she too has a crush, on a third year track star named Takizawa. What is remarkable though, is this crush of Miu's might in fact be helping her playing, and might make it possible for her to once again find the joy in music she knew as a child, the joy that allowed her to play such beautiful, emotional music that captured the hearts of all those that listened.

It is Miu's teacher's hope that a little pressure on her to compose her own piece and play it at the spring recital, will do just that, but problems with Takahashi, and problems in her own life seem to continue to hinder Miu's growth, despite the spark she has once again shown in her musical playing since developing her crush on Takahashi.

Characters
 Miu Nomura - 
 Shirakawa - 
 Kazuya Takahashi - 
 Seiji Nomura - 
 Hitomi Nomura - 
 Akiko Nomura - 
 Yuuki Matsubara - 
 Nagasawa - 
 Takizawa - 
 Ms. Yuunagi -

Anime
The anime uses two pieces of theme song. "...to you" by Ayako Kawasumi, played by Ayako Kawasumi on the piano, is the opening theme, while "Kokoro no Oto" by Yoko Ueno is the ending theme.

Episode listing

Reception
Mania.com's Mark Thomas feels that the anime's music is "in complete harmony with theme of the series". Writing for The Los Angeles Times, Charles Solomon ranked the series the ninth best anime on his "Top 10".

References

External links
 Official RightStuf International Piano: The Melody of A Young Girl's Heart website
  Kids Station's Official Piano Website
  Marine Entertainment's Official Piano Homepage
 

2002 anime television series debuts
Drama anime and manga
Romance anime and manga
School life in anime and manga
OLM, Inc.
2003 Japanese television series endings
Anime with original screenplays
Works about pianos and pianists
Kōsuke Fujishima